This is a list of events related to British television in 1932.

Events
22 August – The BBC starts a regular experimental television service, using John Logie Baird's 30-line mechanical system.
EMI demonstrate electronic television, with up to 3 times as many lines as Baird's mechanical system, to the BBC.

Births
 12 January – Des O'Connor, television personality and singer (died 2020)
 17 April – Tony Bilbow, presenter and screenwriter
 21 April – Bob Grant, comic actor (died 2003)
 25 April – William Roache, actor (Coronation Street)
 8 May – Phyllida Law, Scottish-born actress
 22 June – Prunella Scales, actress
 8 July – Brian Walden, journalist, broadcaster and Member of Parliament (died 2019)
 2 August – Peter O'Toole, British-Irish-born actor (died 2013)
 7 August – Edward Hardwicke, actor (died 2011)
 9 August – Reginald Bosanquet, journalist and news presenter (died 1984)
 20 August – Anthony Ainley, actor (died 2004)
 21 August – Barry Foster, actor (Van der Valk) (died 2002)
 4 September – Dinsdale Landen, actor (died 2003)
 26 September – Andrew Gardner, journalist and newsreader (died 1999)
 30 October – Janice Willett, producer with ABC Weekend TV (died 2018)
 20 November – Richard Dawson, comedian and game show host (died 2012)

See also
 1932 in British music
 1932 in the United Kingdom
 List of British films of 1932

References